Haggertyite is a rare barium, iron, magnesium, titanate mineral: Ba(Fe2+6Ti5Mg)O19 first described in 1996 from the Crater of Diamonds State Park near Murfreesboro in Pike County, Arkansas. The microscopic metallic mineral crystallizes in the hexagonal system and forms tiny hexagonal plates associated with richterite and serpentinitized olivine of mafic xenoliths in the lamproite host rock. It is an iron(II) rich member of the magnetoplumbite group. It is a light grey opaque mineral with calculated Mohs hardness of 5. 

It was named for geophysicist Stephen E. Haggerty (born 1938) of the Florida International University.

References

 Grey, I. E., Danielle Velde, and A. J. Criddle, 1998, Haggertyite, a new magnetoplumbite-type titanate mineral from the Prairie Creek (Arkansas) lamproite: American Mineralogist, v. 83, p. 1323-1329 Am. Min. abstract

Barium minerals
Titanium minerals
Magnesium minerals
Iron(II) minerals
Oxide minerals
Hexagonal minerals
Minerals in space group 194